Animaniacs is an American animated comedy musical television series created by Tom Ruegger for Fox Broadcasting Company's Fox Kids block in 1993, before moving to The WB in 1995, as part of its Kids' WB afternoon programming block, until the series ended on November 14, 1998. It is the second animated series  produced by Steven Spielberg's Amblin Entertainment in association with Warner Bros. Animation, after Tiny Toon Adventures. It initially ran a total of 99 episodes, along with a feature-length film, Wakko's Wish. Reruns later aired on Cartoon Network, Nickelodeon, and Discovery Family, Paramount Network and which was at the time The Hub Network.

Animaniacs is a variety show, with short skits featuring a large cast of characters. While the show had no set format, the majority of episodes were composed of three short mini-episodes, each starring a different set of characters, and bridging segments. Hallmarks of the series included its music, satirical social commentary, pop culture references, character catchphrases, and innuendo directed at an adult audience.

A revival of the series was announced in January 2018, with a two-season order, to be produced in conjunction with Amblin Entertainment and Warner Bros. Animation, with producer Steven Spielberg, songwriter Randy Rogel, and many of the main voice actors returning. It premiered on November 20, 2020, on Hulu, with a second season premiering on November 5, 2021, and a third and final season premiering on February 17, 2023.

Background

Premise 
The Warner siblings live in the Warner Bros. Water Tower on the Warner Bros. studio lot in Burbank, California. However, characters from the series had episodes in various places and periods of time. The Animaniacs characters interacted with famous people and creators of the past and present, as well as mythological characters and characters from contemporary pop culture and television. Andrea Romano, the casting and recording director of Animaniacs, said that the Warner siblings functioned to "tie the show together," by appearing in and introducing other characters' segments.

Each Animaniacs episode usually consisted of two or three cartoon shorts. Animaniacs segments ranged in time, from bridging segments less than a minute long to episodes spanning the entire show's length; writer Peter Hastings said that the varying episode lengths gave the show a "sketch comedy" atmosphere.

Characters 

Animaniacs had a large cast of characters, separated into individual segments, with each pair or set of characters acting in its own plot. The Warner siblings, Yakko, Wakko, and Dot, are three 1930s cartoon stars of an unknown species (one Tom Ruegger named "Cartoonus characterus") that were locked away in the WB Tower until the 1990s, when they escaped. After their escape, they often interacted with other Warner Bros. studio workers, including Ralph the Security Guard; Dr. Otto Scratchansniff, the studio psychiatrist; and his assistant, Hello Nurse. Pinky and the Brain are two genetically altered anthropomorphic laboratory mice who continuously plot and attempt to take over the world. Slappy Squirrel is an octogenarian anthropomorphic cartoon star who can easily outwit antagonists and uses her wiles to educate her nephew, Skippy Squirrel, about cartoon techniques. Additional principal characters included three anthropomorphic Italian-American pigeons known as The Goodfeathers, Buttons and Mindy, Chicken Boo, Flavio and Marita (The Hip Hippos) and Katie Ka-Boom. Exclusive to the first season, Rita and Runt, two strays that get into massive trouble and adventures, and Minerva Mink, an young attractive anthropomorphic mink, starred in their own segments. The Pinky and the Brain segment was the only segment, aside from the Warners themselves, to get in the reboot, excluding the episode "Good Warner Hunting", in which all the original characters appeared at the end of the episode, excluding Pinky and the Brain.

Production

Conception 

Prior to Animaniacs, Warner Bros. had been working to get Steven Spielberg to make an animated film for the studio. To help court Spielberg's favor, the head of Warner Bros. Animation Jean MacCurdy brought director Tom Ruegger, who had successfully led A Pup Named Scooby-Doo, to help develop the concept with Spielberg. Ruegger pitched the idea to Spielberg of using younger versions of the Looney Tunes characters while capturing the same wackiness of those cartoons, eventually leading into Tiny Toon Adventures. Tiny Toon Adventures was considered a success, winning a number of Daytime Emmy awards and a Primetime Emmy award and revived the Warner Bros. Animation department.

With Tiny Toon Adventures success, Spielberg and MacCurdy pushed on Ruegger for the next idea for a series, with Spielberg emphasizing the need for something with a marquee name. Ruegger had already envisioned pulling three characters that he had created for his student film The Premiere of Platypus Duck while attending Dartmouth College, a trio of platypuses for this new series, and made a connection to Warner Bros. after walking around the studio lot and seeing its signature water tower. He came up with making this trio the Warner Brothers and their sister Dot (the latter representing the period in the "Warner Bros." name), tying the characters directly to the studio with their approval. Along with reviving the character designs, Ruegger drew characterization for the Warner siblings from his three sons who could be troublemakers at the time. Because the Warners were portrayed as cartoon stars from the early 1930s, Ruegger and other artists for Animaniacs made the images of the Warners similar to cartoon characters of the early 1930s. Simple, black and white drawings of minstrels were very common in cartoons of the 1920s and 1930s, such as Buddy, Felix the Cat, Oswald the Lucky Rabbit, and the early versions of Mickey Mouse and Minnie Mouse.

Writing 
Steven Spielberg served as executive producer, under his Amblin Entertainment label. Showrunner and senior producer Tom Ruegger lead the overall production and writer's room. Ruegger initially brought in Sherri Stoner, who had also contributed to Tiny Toons Adventures, to help expand the series' concept. Producers Peter Hastings, Sherri Stoner, Rusty Mills, and Rich Arons contributed scripts for many of the episodes and had an active role during group discussions in the writer's room as well. Stoner helped to recruit most of the remaining writing staff, which included Liz Holzman, Paul Rugg, Deanna Oliver, John McCann, Nicholas Hollander, Charlie Howell, Gordon Bressack, Jeff Kwitny, Earl Kress, Tom Minton, and Randy Rogel. Hastings, Rugg, Stoner, McCann, Howell, and Bressack were involved in writing sketch comedy while others, including Kress, Minton, and Rogel, came from cartoon backgrounds.

The writers and animators of Animaniacs used the experience gained from the previous series to create new characters cast in the mold of Chuck Jones and Tex Avery's creations, following on the back-and-forth of many of the pairings from their classic shorts. The Marx Brothers, particularly with their breaking of the fourth wall, also played heavily into the comic styling they wanted for the show.

While the Warner siblings served as the central point of the show, the writing staff worked out developing other pairings or trios so as to make the cartoon more like a variety show with sketch comedy. Executive producer Steven Spielberg said that the irreverence in Looney Tunes cartoons inspired the Animaniacs cast. Just as Ruegger wrote the Warner siblings based on his own sons, other pairings or trios were based on similar personal relations the writing staff had. Ruegger created Pinky and the Brain after being inspired by the personalities of two of his Tiny Toon Adventures colleagues, Eddie Fitzgerald and Tom Minton, who worked in the same office. Ruegger thought of the premise for Pinky and the Brain when wondering what would happen if Minton and Fitzgerald tried to take over the world, and cemented the idea after he modified a caricature of the pair drawn by animator Bruce Timm by adding mice ears and noses.
 Deanna Oliver contributed The Goodfeathers scripts and the character Chicken Boo, while Nicholas Hollander based Katie Ka-Boom on his teenage daughter. Stoner created Slappy the Squirrel when another writer and friend of Stoner, John McCann, made fun of Stoner's career in TV movies playing troubled teenagers. When McCann joked that Sherri would be playing troubled teenagers when she was 50 years old, the latter developed the idea of Slappy's characteristics as an older person acting like a teenager. Stoner liked the idea of an aged cartoon character because an aged cartoon star would know the secrets of other cartoons and "have the dirt on [them]". Several additional sets of characters were also created and vetted by Spielberg for inclusion in the show. Among those that were kept included The Hip Hippos, Rita and Runt, Minerva Mink and Buttons and Mindy, the latter of which due to Spielberg's daughter.

Made-up stories did not exclusively comprise Animaniacs writing, as Hastings remarked: "We weren't really there to tell compelling stories ... [As a writer] you could do a real story, you could recite the Star-Spangled Banner, or you could parody a commercial ... you could do all these kinds of things, and we had this tremendous freedom and a talent to back it up." Writers for the series wrote into Animaniacs stories that happened to them; the episodes "Ups and Downs," "Survey Ladies," and "I Got Yer Can" were episodes based on true stories that happened to Rugg, Deanna Oliver, and Stoner, respectively. Another episode, "Bumbie's Mom," both parodied the film Bambi and was based on Stoner's childhood reaction to the film.

In an interview, the writers explained how Animaniacs allowed for non-restrictive and open writing. Hastings said that the format of the series had the atmosphere of a sketch comedy show because Animaniacs segments could widely vary in both time and subject, while Stoner described how the Animaniacs writing staff worked well as a team in that writers could consult other writers on how to write or finish a story, as was the case in the episode "The Three Muska-Warners". Rugg, Hastings and Stoner also mentioned how the Animaniacs writing was free in that the writers were allowed to write about parody subjects that would not be touched on other series.

Animaniacs was developed following the passage of the Children's Television Act in 1990 that required that programming aimed at children to include educational content. The writers worked this into the show in part by featuring segments involving the characters interacting with historical figures, and creating songs like "Yakko's World", which listed out all the countries of the world at the time, to serve as educational content.

Cast 
Animaniacs featured Rob Paulsen as Yakko, Pinky, and Dr. Otto von Scratchansniff, Tress MacNeille as Dot, Jess Harnell as Wakko, show writer Sherri Stoner as Slappy Squirrel, Maurice LaMarche as the Brain, Squit and the belching segments "The Great Wakkorotti" (Harnell said that he himself is commonly mistaken for the role), and veteran voice actor Frank Welker as Ralph the Security Guard, Thaddeus Plotz and Runt. Andrea Romano said that the casters wanted Paulsen to play the role of Yakko: "We had worked with Rob Paulsen before on a couple of other series and we wanted him to play Yakko." Romano said that the casters had "no trouble" choosing the role of Dot, referring to MacNeille as "just hilarious ...And yet [she had] that edge." MacNeille had already been part of Tiny Toons Adventures as Babs Bunny, a role "custom made" for her, and Spielberg encouraged her to audition for the role of Dot in Animaniacs. Before Animaniacs, Harnell had little experience in voice acting other than minor roles for Disney which he "fell into". Harnell revealed that at the audition for the show, he did a John Lennon impression and the audition "went great".

For Pinky and the Brain, LaMarche had been a long-time aficionado of Orson Welles, including the infamous Frozen Peas outtake, and when he auditioned for various characters in the show, immediately saw the Brain as having a Welles-like character, adapting his voice for the role. Paulsen took inspiration from British comedy such as Monty Python's Flying Circus for Pinky's voice.

Stoner commented that when she gave an impression of what the voice would be to Spielberg, he said she should play Slappy herself. According to Romano, she personally chose Bernadette Peters to play Rita. Other voices were provided by Jim Cummings, Paul Rugg, Vernee Watson-Johnson, Jeff Bennett and Gail Matthius. Tom Ruegger's three sons also played roles in the series. Nathan Ruegger voiced Skippy Squirrel, the nephew of Slappy, throughout the duration of the series; Luke Ruegger voiced The Flame in historical segments on Animaniacs; and Cody Ruegger voiced Birdie from Wild Blue Yonder.

Animation 
Animation work on Animaniacs was farmed out to several different studios, both American and international, over the course of the show's production. The animation companies included Tokyo Movie Shinsha of Japan, StarToons of Chicago, Wang Film Productions of Taiwan, Shanghai Morning Sun Animation and Sichuan Top Animation of China, Freelance Animators New Zealand of New Zealand, Seoul Movie (a subsidiary of TMS) and AKOM of South Korea, and most Animaniacs episodes frequently had animation from different companies in each episode's respective segments.

Animaniacs was made with a higher production value than standard television animation; the series had a higher cel count than most TV cartoons. The Animaniacs characters often move fluidly, and do not regularly stand still and speak, as in other television cartoons.

Music 
Animaniacs utilized a heavy musical score for an animated program, with every episode featuring at least one original score. The idea for an original musical score in every episode came from Steven Spielberg. Animaniacs used a 35-piece orchestra, and seven composers were contracted to write original underscore for the series' run: Richard Stone, Steve Bernstein, Julie Bernstein, Carl Johnson, J. Eric Schmidt, Gordon Goodwin, and Tim Kelly. The use of the large orchestra in modern Warner Bros. animation began with Animaniacs predecessor, Tiny Toon Adventures, but Spielberg pushed for its use even more in Animaniacs. Although the outcome was a very expensive show to produce, "the sound sets us apart from everyone else in animation," said Jean MacCurdy, the executive in charge of production for the series. According to Steve and Julie Bernstein, not only was the Animaniacs music written in the same style as that of Looney Tunes composer Carl Stalling, it was recorded at the Eastwood Scoring Stage, which was used by Stalling as well as its piano. Senior producer Tom Ruegger said that writers Randy Rogel, Nicholas Hollander, and Deanna Oliver wrote "a lot of music" for the series.

Hallmarks and humor 

The humor of Animaniacs varies in type, ranging from parody to cartoon violence. The series made parodies of television shows and films. In an interview, Spielberg defended the "irreverence" of Animaniacs, saying that the Animaniacs crew has "a point of view" and does not "sit back passively and play both sides equally". Spielberg also said that Animaniacs humor of social commentary and irreverence were inspired by the Marx Brothers and Looney Tunes cartoons. Animaniacs, among other Spielberg-produced series, had a large amount of cartoon violence. Spielberg defended the violence in Animaniacs by saying that the series had a balance of both violent humor and educational segments, so the series would never become either too violent or "benign". Animaniacs also made use of catchphrases, recurring jokes and segments, and "adult" humor.

 Recurring jokes and catchphrases 
Characters on Animaniacs had catchphrases, with some characters having more than one. Notable catchphrases include Yakko's "Goodnight, everybody!" often said following adult humor, Wakko's "Faboo!" and Dot's frequent assertions of her cuteness. The most prominent catchphrase that was said by all three Warners was "Hello-o-o, nurse!" Tom Ruegger said that the "Hello-o-o, nurse!" line was intended to be a catchphrase much like Bugs Bunny's line, "Eh, what's up, Doc?" Before the theme song for each "Pinky and the Brain" segment, Pinky asks, "Gee, Brain, what do you want to do tonight?", to which Brain replies, "The same thing we do every night, Pinky: try to take over the world!" During these episodes, Brain often asks Pinky, "Pinky, are you pondering what I'm pondering?" whenever inspiration for a part of his plan has struck him and Pinky replies with a silly non sequitur that changes with every episode. Writer Peter Hastings said that he unintentionally created these catchphrases when he wrote the episode "Win Big", and then producer Sherri Stoner used them and had them put into later episodes.

Running gags and recurring segments were very common in the series. The closing credits for each episode always included one joke credit and ended with a water tower gag similar to The Simpsons couch gag. Director Rusty Mills and senior producer Tom Ruegger said that recurring segments like the water tower gag and another segment titled "The Wheel of Morality" (which, in Yakko's words, "adds boring educational value to what would otherwise be an almost entirely entertaining program", and ends with a "moral" that makes absolutely no sense) eased the production of episodes because the same animated scenes could be used more than once (and, in the case of the Wheel segments, enabled the producers to add a segment in where there was not room for anything else in the episode).

 Humor and content intended for adults 
A great deal of Animaniacs'  humor and content was aimed at an adult audience, revolving around hidden sexual innuendo and throwback pop culture references.  Animaniacs parodied the film A Hard Day's Night and the Three Tenors, references that The New York Times wrote were "appealing to older audiences". The comic operas of Gilbert and Sullivan Pirates of Penzance and H.M.S. Pinafore were parodied in episode 3, "HMS Yakko". The Warners' personalities were made similar to those of the Marx Brothers and Jerry Lewis, in that they, according to writer Peter Hastings, "wreak havoc" in "serious situations". In addition, the show's recurring "Goodfeathers" segment was populated with characters based on characters from The Godfather and Goodfellas, R-rated crime dramas neither marketed nor intended for children. Some content of Animaniacs was not only aimed at an adult audience, it was suggestive in nature; one character, Minerva Mink, had episodes that network censors considered too sexually suggestive for the show's intended audience, for which she was soon de-emphasized as a featured character. Jokes involving such innuendo would often end with Yakko telling "Goodnight, everybody!" as a punchline.

 Parodies 
Animaniacs parodied popular TV shows and movies and caricatured celebrities. Animaniacs made fun of celebrities, major motion pictures, television series for adults (Seinfeld, Beverly Hills 90210 and Friends, among others), television series for children (such as Barney & Friends and Rugrats), and trends in the U.S. One episode even made fun of competing show Power Rangers, and another episode caricatured Animaniacs' own Internet fans. Animaniacs also made potshots of Disney films, creating parodies of such films as The Lion King, Beauty and the Beast, Pocahontas, Bambi, and others. Animaniacs director Russell Calabrese said that not only did it become a compliment to be parodied on Animaniacs, being parodied on the series would be taken as a "badge of honor".

 Songs 
Animaniacs had a variety of music types. Many Animaniacs songs were parodies of classical or folk music with educational lyrics. These include Yakko's World and the Nations of the World updated in which Yakko sings the names of all 200-some nations of the world at the time to the tune of the "Mexican Hat Dance". "Wakko's America" listed all the United States and their capitals to the tune of "Turkey in the Straw". Another song, titled "The Presidents", named every U.S. president at the time to the tune of the "William Tell Overture" (with brief snippets of the tunes "Mademoiselle from Armentieres" and "Dixie"). Non-educational song parodies were also used, such as "Slippin' on the Ice," a parody of "Singin' in the Rain". Most of the groups of characters had their own theme songs for their segments on the show.

The Animaniacs theme song, performed by the Warners, won an Emmy Award for best song. Ruegger wrote the lyrics, and Stone composed the music for the title sequence. Several Animaniacs albums and sing-along VHS tapes were released, including the CDs Animaniacs, Yakko's World, and Animaniacs Variety Pack, and the tapes Animaniacs Sing-Along: Yakko's World and Animaniacs Sing-Along: Mostly in Toon.

 Reception 
Animaniacs was a successful show, gathering both child and adult fans. The series received ratings higher than its competitors and won eight Daytime Emmy Awards.

 Ratings and popularity 
During its run, Animaniacs became the second-most popular children's show among both ages 2–11 and ages 6–11 (behind Mighty Morphin Power Rangers). Animaniacs, along with other animated series, helped to bring "Fox Kids" ratings much larger than those of the channel's competitors. In November 1993, Animaniacs and Tiny Toon Adventures almost doubled the ratings of rivals Darkwing Duck and Goof Troop among ages 2–11 and 6–11, which are both very important demographics to children's networks. On Kids' WB, Animaniacs gathered about 1 million child viewers every week.

While Animaniacs was popular among younger viewers (the target demographic for Warner Bros.' TV cartoons), adults also responded positively to the show; in 1995, more than one-fifth of the weekday (4 p.m., Monday through Friday) and Saturday morning (8 a.m.) audience viewers were 25 years or older. The large adult fanbase even led to one of the first Internet-based fandom cultures. During the show's prime, the usenet newsgroup alt.tv.animaniacs was an active gathering place for fans of the show (most of whom were adults) to post reference guides, fan fiction, and fan-made artwork about Animaniacs. The online popularity of the show did not go unnoticed by the show's producers, and twenty of the most active participants on the newsgroup were invited to the Warner Bros. Animation studios for a gathering in August 1995.

 Nominations and awards 

|-
| rowspan="8" scope="row" | 1994
| 53rd Annual Peabody Awards
|Peabody Award
|Warner Brothers Animation, Amblin Entertainment, Fox Children's Network
|Won|-
| rowspan="4" |
|Outstanding Achievement in Music Direction and Composition
|Richard Stone and Steve Bernstein
|Won|-
|Outstanding Original Song
|Richard Stone and Tom Ruegger for "Animaniacs Theme Song"
|Won|-
|Outstanding Animated Children's Program
|• Steven Spielberg (executive producer)• Sherri Stoner (producer)• Rich Arons (producer/animation director)• Tom Ruegger (coordinating producer)•  Michael Gerard (animation director)• Alfred Gimeno (animation director)• Bob Kline (animation director)• Jenny Lerew (animation director)• Rusty Mills (animation director)• Audu Paden (animation director)• Greg Reyna (animation director)• Lenord Robinson (animation director)• Barry Caldwell (animation director)
|Nominated
|-
|Outstanding Writing in an Animated Program
|• John P. McCann• Nicholas Hollander• Tom Minton• Paul Rugg • Deanna Oliver• Tom Ruegger• Sherri Stoner• Randy Rogel• Peter Hastings
|Nominated
|-
|
|Outstanding Achievement in Children's Programming
|Warner Bros. Animation and Amblin Entertainment
|Nominated
|-
| rowspan="2"|
|Best Animated Television Program
|Warner Bros. Animation
|Nominated
|-
|Best Achievement for Voice Acting
|Frank Welker
|Nominated
|-
| rowspan="8" scope="row" | 1995
| rowspan="3" | 
|Outstanding Animated Children's Program
|• Steven Spielberg (executive producer)• Rich Arons (producer)• Sherri Stoner (producer)• Tom Ruegger (senior producer)
|Nominated
|-
|Outstanding Achievement in Animation
|• Rich Arons (director)• Barry Caldwell (director)• Michael Gerard (director)• Alfred Gimeno (director)• David Marshall (director)• Jon McClenahan (director)• Rusty Mills (director)• Audu Paden (director)• Greg Reyna (director)• Lenord Robinson (director)• Andrea Romano (director)• Peter Hastings (writer)• Nicholas Hollander (writer)• John P. McCann (writer)• Tom Minton (writer)• Deanna Oliver (writer)• Randy Rogel (writer)• Paul Rugg (writer)• Tom Ruegger (writer)• Sherri Stoner (writer)
|Nominated
|-
|Outstanding Music Direction and Composition
|Richard Stone and Steve Bernstein
|Nominated
|-
|
|Favorite Cartoon
|Animaniacs
|Nominated
|-| rowspan="4" |
|Outstanding Achievement in Music Direction and Composition
|Richard Stone and Steve Bernstein
|Won|-
|Voice Acting in the Field of Animation
|Rob Paulsen as the voice of Yakko Warner
|Nominated
|-
|Best Individual Achievement for Music in the Field of Animation
|Richard Stone (supervising composer)
|Nominated
|-
|Best Animated Television Program
|Warner Bros. Television Animation
|Nominated
|-
| rowspan="7" scope="row" | 1996
| (Young Artist Awards)
|Best Family Animated Production
|Animaniacs
|Won|-
|
|Favorite Cartoon
|Animaniacs
|Nominated
|-
| rowspan="3" | 
|Outstanding Children's Animated Program
|• Steven Spielberg (executive producer)• Tom Ruegger (senior producer)• Peter Hastings (producer)• Rusty Mills (producer)
|Won|-
|Outstanding Achievement in Animation
|• Gordon Bressack (writer)• Charles M. Howell IV (writer)• Peter Hastings (writer)• Randy Rogel (writer)• Tom Ruegger (writer)• Paul Rugg (writer)• Liz Holzman (director)• Audu Paden (director)• Andrea Romano (director)• Al Zegler (director)• Joey Banaszkiewicz (storyboard artist)• Barry Caldwell (storyboard artist)• Brian Mitchell (storyboard artist)• John Over (storyboard artist)• Norma Rivera (storyboard artist)• Rhoydon Shishido (storyboard artist)• Marcus Williams (storyboard artist)• Mark Zoeller (storyboard artist)
|Won|-
|Outstanding Music Direction and Composition
|Steve Bernstein, Carl Johnson, and Richard Stone
|Nominated
|-
| rowspan="2" |
|Best Animated Television Program
|Warner Bros. Television Animation and Amblin Entertainment
|Nominated
|-
|Best Individual Achievement: Music
|• Richard Stone• Steve Bernstein• Julie Bernstein
|Nominated
|-
| rowspan="5" scope="row" | 1997
|1st Annual Online Film & Television Association Awards
|OFTA Television Award for Best Animated Series
|Animaniacs
|Nominated
|-
|
|Favorite Cartoon
|Animaniacs
|Nominated
|-
| rowspan="2" | 
|Outstanding Children's Animated Program
|• Steven Spielberg (executive producer)• Liz Holzman (producer/director)• Rusty Mills (producer/director)• Peter Hastings (producer/writer)• Tom Ruegger (senior producer/writer)• Charles Visser (director)• Andrea Romano (director)• Audu Paden (director)• Jon McClenahan (director)• Randy Rogel (writer)• John P. McCann (writer)• Paul Rugg (writer)• Nick DuBois (writer)
|Won|-
|Outstanding Music Direction and Composition
|• Richard Stone (composer)• Steve Bernstein (composer)• Julie Bernstein (composer)
|Won|-
|
|Best Individual Achievement: Directing in a TV Production
|Charles Visser for episode "Noel"
|Nominated
|-
| rowspan="3" scope="row" | 1998
| rowspan="2" | 
|Outstanding Music Direction and Composition
|• Richard Stone (composer)• Steve Bernstein (composer)• Julie Bernstein (composer)• Gordon Goodwin (composer)
|Won|-
|Outstanding Children's Animated Program
|• Steven Spielberg (executive producer)• Tom Ruegger (senior producer/writer)• Rusty Mills (supervising producer/director)• Liz Holzman (producer/director)• Andrea Romano (director)• Mike Milo (director)• Jon McClenahan (director)• Charles M. Howell IV (writer)• Randy Rogel (writer)• Kevin Hopps (writer)• Gordon Bressack (writer)• Nick DuBois (writer)
|Nominated
|-
|
|Outstanding Achievement in an Animated Daytime Television Program
|Animaniacs
|Nominated
|-
| rowspan="2" scope="row" | 1999
| rowspan="2" | 
|Outstanding Music Direction and Composition
|• Richard Stone (composer)• Steve Bernstein (composer)• Tim Kelly (composer)• Julie Bernstein (composer)• Gordon Goodwin (composer)
|Won|-
|Outstanding Children's Animated Program
||• Steven Spielberg (executive producer)• Tom Ruegger (senior producer/writer)• Rusty Mills (supervising producer/director)• Liz Holzman• Randy Rogel (writer)• Kevin Hopps (writer)• Nick DuBois (writer)• Charles M. Howell IV (writer)• Earl Kress (writer)• Wendell Morris (writer)• Tom Sheppard (writer)• Andrea Romano (director)• Stephen Lewis (director)• Kirk Tingblad (director)• Mike Milo (director)• Nelson Recinos (director)• Russell Calabrese (director)• Herb Moore (director)• Dave Pryor (director)
|Nominated
|-
|2019
|Online Film & Television Association
|OFTA TV Hall of Fame- Television Programs
|Animaniacs
|Won'''
|}

 History 

 Fox Kids era: Episodes 1–69 Animaniacs premiered on September 13, 1993, on the Fox Kids programming block of the Fox network, and ran there until September 8, 1995; new episodes aired from the 1993 through 1994 seasons. Animaniacs aired with a 65-episode first season because these episodes were ordered by Fox all at once. While on Fox Kids, Animaniacs gained fame for its name and became the second-most popular show among children ages 2–11 and children ages 6–11, second only to Mighty Morphin Power Rangers (which began that same year). On March 30, 1994, Yakko, Wakko, and Dot first theatrically appeared in the animated short, "I'm Mad", which opened nationwide alongside the full-length animated feature, Thumbelina. The musical short featured Yakko, Wakko, and Dot bickering during a car trip. Producers Steven Spielberg, Tom Ruegger, and Jean MacCurdy wanted "I'm Mad" to be the first of a series of shorts to bring Animaniacs to a wider audience. However, "I'm Mad" was the only Animaniacs theatrical short produced. The short was later incorporated into Animaniacs episode 69. Following the 65th episode of the series, Animaniacs continued to air in reruns on Fox Kids. The only new episodes during this time included a short, four-episode second season that was quickly put together from unused scripts. After Fox Kids aired Animaniacs reruns for a year, the series switched to the new Warner Bros. children's programming block, Kids' WB.

 Kids' WB era: Episodes 70–99 
The series was popular enough for Warner Bros. Animation to invest in additional episodes of Animaniacs past the traditional 65-episode marker for syndication. Animaniacs premiered on the new Kids' WB line-up on September 9, 1995, with a new season of 13 episodes. At this time, the show's popular cartoon characters, Pinky and the Brain, were spun off from Animaniacs into their own half-hour TV series. Warner Bros. stated in a press release that Animaniacs gathered over 1 million children viewers every week.

Despite the series' success on Fox Kids, Animaniacs on Kids' WB was successful only in an unintended way, bringing in adult viewers and viewers outside the Kids' WB target demographic of young children. This unintended result of adult viewers and not enough young viewers put pressure on the WB network from advertisers and caused dissatisfaction from the WB network towards Animaniacs. Slowly, orders from the WB for more Animaniacs episodes dwindled and Animaniacs had a couple more short seasons, relying on leftover scripts and storyboards. The fourth season had eight episodes, which was reduced from 18 because of Warner Bros.' dissatisfaction with the series. The 99th and final Animaniacs episode aired on November 14, 1998.The Chicago Tribune reported in 1999 that the production of new Animaniacs episodes ceased and the direct-to-video feature film Animaniacs: Wakko's Wish was a closer to the series. Animation World Network reported that Warner Bros. laid off over 100 artists, contributing to the reduced production of the original series. Producer Tom Ruegger explained that rather than produce new episodes, Warner Bros. instead decided to use the back-catalog of Animaniacs episodes until "someone clamors for more." Animaniacs segments were shown along with segments from other cartoons as part of The Cat&Birdy Warneroonie PinkyBrainy Big Cartoonie Show. Ruegger said at the time the hiatus was "temporary". Following the end of the series, the Animaniacs team developed Animaniacs: Wakko's Wish, which was released on December 21, 1999. In 2016, Ruegger said on his Reddit AMA that the decline of Animaniacs and other series was the result of Warner Bros.' investment in the much cheaper anime series Pokémon. After Warner Bros. gained distribution rights to the cheaper and successful anime, the network chose to invest less in original programming like Animaniacs. 

 After Animaniacs 
After Animaniacs, Spielberg collaborated with Warner Bros. Animation again to produce the short-lived series Steven Spielberg Presents Freakazoid, along with the Animaniacs spin-off series Pinky and the Brain, from which Pinky, Elmyra & the Brain was later spun off. Warner Bros. also produced two other comedy animated series in the later half of the decade titled Histeria! and Detention, which were short-lived and unsuccessful compared to the earlier series. Later, Warner Bros. cut back the size of its animation studio because the show Histeria! went over its budget, and most production on further Warner Bros. animated comedy series ended.

Since 2016, Paulsen, Harnell, and MacNeille have toured as Animaniacs Live!, performing songs from Animaniacs! along with a full orchestra. Among the songs will be an updated version of "Yakko's World" by Randy Rogel that includes a new verse to include nations that have been formed since the song's original airing, such as those from the break-up of the Soviet Union.

 Wakko's Wish 

The Warners starred in the feature-length direct-to-video movie Animaniacs: Wakko's Wish. The movie takes place in the fictional town of Acme Falls, in which the Warners and the rest of the Animaniacs cast are under the rule of a greedy king who conquered their home country from a neighboring country. When the Warners find out about a star that will grant a wish to the first person that touches it, the Warners, the villagers (the Animaniacs cast), and the king race to get to it first. Although children and adults rated Animaniacs: Wakko's Wish highly in test-screenings, Warner Bros. decided to release it direct-to-video, rather than spend money on advertising. Warner Bros. released the movie on VHS on December 21, 1999; the film was then released on DVD much later on October 7, 2014.

 Merchandise 
 Home media 

Episodes of the show have been released on DVD and VHS during and after the series' run.

VHS tapes of Animaniacs were released in the United States and in the United Kingdom. All of these tapes are out of print, but are still available at online sellers. The episodes featured are jumbled at random and are in no particular order with the series. Each video featured four to five episodes each which were accompanied by a handful of shorter skits, with a running time of about 45 minutes.

Beginning on July 25, 2006, Warner Home Video began releasing DVD volume sets of Animaniacs episodes in order of the episodes' original airdates. Volume one of Animaniacs sold very well; over half of the product being sold in the first week made it one of the fastest selling animation DVD sets that Warner Home Video ever put out.

 Print 
An Animaniacs comic book, published by DC Comics, ran from 1995 to 2000 (59 regular monthly issues, plus two Specials). Initially, these featured all the characters except for Pinky and the Brain, who were published in their own comic book series (which ran for a Christmas Special issue and then 27 regular issues from July 1996 to November 1998 before its cancellation), though cameos were possible. The Animaniacs comic book series was later renamed Animaniacs! featuring Pinky and the Brain with issue #43 and ran for another 16 issues before its cancellation. The Animaniacs comic book series, like the TV series, parodied TV, film and comic book standards such as Pulp Fiction and The X-Files, among others.

 Video games Animaniacs was soon brought into the video game industry to produce games based on the series. The list includes titles such as:
 Animaniacs (1994, Genesis, SNES, Game Boy)
 Animaniacs Game Pack! (1997, PC)
 Pinky and the Brain: World Conquest (1998, PC)
 Animaniacs: Ten Pin Alley (1998, PS1)
 Animaniacs: A Gigantic Adventure (1999, PC)
 Animaniacs: Splat Ball! (1999, PC)
 Pinky and the Brain: The Master Plan (2002, GBA, Europe only)
 Animaniacs: The Great Edgar Hunt (2005, GC, PS2, Xbox)
 Animaniacs: Lights, Camera, Action! (2005, GBA, DS).

 Musical collections 
Because Animaniacs had many songs, record labels Rhino Entertainment and Time Warner Kids produced albums featuring songs from the series. These albums include:
 Animaniacs (1993)
 Yakko's World (1994)
 Animaniacs Variety Pack (1995)

Additionally, a book on tape album, A Christmas Plotz, was produced during the show's run and subsequently re-issued on CD as A Hip-Hopera Christmas. After the series' run, two additional discount albums compiling tracks from previous releases were released under Rhino's Flashback label, The Animaniacs Go Hollywood and The Animaniacs Wacky Universe, and the compilation album The Animaniacs Faboo! Collection (1995).

 2020 revival/reboot 

A two-season reboot of Animaniacs'' was ordered by Hulu in May 2017, following the popularity of the original series after Netflix had added it to their library in 2016. The first season of 13 episodes was broadcast on November 20, 2020, while the second season was released on November 5, 2021. Wellesley Wild served as the showrunner and as executive producer along with Gabe Swarr. According to Wild, Steven Spielberg was heavily involved with bringing the series back and insisting on many of the original voice cast and elements be used for the revival. This includes the return of Yakko, Wakko, and Dot (voiced by Paulsen, Harnell, and MacNeille) and Pinky and the Brain (voiced by Paulsen and LaMarche), and the use of a small orchestra for the musical works composed by Julie and Steven Bernstein, who both composed additional music during the series' original run, as well as other composers trained by Richard Stone and Randy Rogel.

Notes

References

Works cited

External links 

 
 
 
 The official DVD website
 Animaniacs at Don Markstein's Toonopedia. Archived from the original on April 4, 2012.

 
1993 American television series debuts
1998 American television series endings
1990s American animated television series
1990s American children's comedy television series
1990s American musical comedy television series
1990s American satirical television series
1990s American sketch comedy television series
1990s American surreal comedy television series
1990s American variety television series
American children's animated comedy television series
American children's animated education television series
American children's animated musical television series
Animated television series about orphans
Children's sketch comedy
Crossover animated television series
Daytime Emmy Award for Outstanding Animated Program winners
DC Comics titles
English-language television shows
Fox Kids
Fox Broadcasting Company original programming
Kids' WB original shows
Peabody Award-winning television programs
Self-reflexive television
Animated television series about mammals
Animated television series about siblings
Television series by Amblin Entertainment
Television series by Warner Bros. Animation
Television series by Warner Bros. Television Studios
Television series created by Tom Ruegger
Television shows set in Burbank, California
Television shows adapted into comics
Television shows adapted into video games
The WB original programming
Metafictional television series
Reading and literacy television series